Stockholm Roller Derby (STRD) is a women's flat track roller derby league based in Stockholm, Sweden. Founded in 2007, the league currently consists of four teams which compete against teams from other leagues and the league also has their own group of officials.

Stockholm Allstars consists of STRD’s WFTDA 20 charter. Stockholm BSTRDs compete in the top tier of Swedish national play, Elitserien. Stockholm C-Stars play in Division 2 of Swedish national play. YoungSTRDs find themselves in matches against other junior teams.  Stockholm Roller Derby is a member of the Women's Flat Track Derby Association (WFTDA).

History
The first roller derby league in Sweden, Stockholm Roller Derby was founded by Nattis Mörkenstam, Linn Hultström, Jenny Stendahl, Emmelie Bogårdh and Michel Diaz Nocetti and initially practised in a garage.  They struggled to find a permanent practice venue, and initially recruited only slowly.  However, the league received a major boost when the film Whip It! was released, and found training space in an abandoned shopping mall.  By mid-2010, the league had forty skaters, while three other leagues had emerged in the country, including the Crime City Rollers.

Stockholm played their first bout in October 2010, against Helsinki Roller Derby, and took part in the first all-Swedish bout in March 2011, against Crime City.  The league also participated in the first Scandinavian tournament, "Battle of the Nordic Light", losing to Helsinki but beating Copenhagen.

In October 2011, Stockholm became an apprentice member of the Women's Flat Track Derby Association, and it graduated to full membership in December 2012.  Seven of Stockholm's skaters were selected to play for Team Sweden at the 2011 Roller Derby World Cup.

WFTDA competition
At the first European WFTDA tournament in November 2012, "Track Queens Battle Royal", Stockholm came at third place out of ten bouting teams, defending their ingoing ranking for the tournament. Stockholm first qualified for the international WFTDA Division 1 Playoffs in 2015, entering the Dallas tournament as the fifth seed, and finishing in seventh place. In 2016, Stockholm returned to Division 1 Playoffs, entering the Vancouver tournament as the eighth seed and again finishing in seventh place. At the 2017 Malmo Division 1 Playoff, Stockholm won their opening game against Terminal City Rollergirls 197-145, but then lost their quarterfinal against Denver Roller Derby, 330-152. Stockholm finished the weekend with a 184-166 consolation bracket victory over Kallio Rolling Rainbow. In 2018, Stockholm qualified for the WFTDA Playoff in A Coruña, Spain, finishing out of the medals with a consolation round loss to 2×4 Roller Derby, 208-172.

Rankings

 CR = consolation round

Social media & video footage 

Facebook https://www.facebook.com/StockholmRollerDerby/ 
Instagram  

 Game footage https://solidsport.com/stockholm-roller-derby

Supporting Stockholm Roller Derby 

 STRD Beerleaders https://rollerderby.se/strd-beerleaders/

References

Roller derby leagues in Sweden
Sport in Stockholm
Roller derby leagues established in 2007
Women's Flat Track Derby Association Division 1
2007 establishments in Sweden